Anders Munk (born 1922 in Kolding – died June 1989 in Copenhagen) was a Danish mycologist. He was an expert of the fungal group colloquially known as the Pyrenomycetes, and best known for his 1957 work "Danish Pyrenomycetes".

Biography
Munk's introduction to mycology was from Poul Larsen, who was previously a teacher and a former colleague of Munk's parents. Around that time Munk also made contact with biologist Øjvind Winge, who introduced Munk to the Pyrenomycetes, which were also his own main interest. Munk started studying botany at the University of Copenhagen in 1940. His interest in the fungi was further enhanced after reading John Axel Nannfeldt's 1932 work on the morphology and systematics of the discomycetes. Munk worked for some summers at the then-newly started , where he increased his knowledge about the ecology of the Pyrenomycetes.

After graduating in 1946, Munk got a short-term job at Løvens Kemiske Fabrik (now LEO Pharma). He continued his graduate studies in his spare time, and defended his doctoral dissertation in 1953. Apart from a short-term scholarship with Morten Lange in 1963, the rest of Munk's career was largely devoted to teaching.

Munk was married to Ruth, who he met as a fellow student at university, and with whom he had four children. He spent the last years of his life in pain from spondylosis of the cervical vertebrae.

Eponymy
Several fungi have been named to honour Munk, including: Capronia munkii ; Endoxyla munkii ; Hypoxylon munkii ; and Trichodelitschia munkii .

Selected works

See also
 :Category:Taxa named by Anders Munk

References

1922 births
1989 deaths
Danish mycologists
Taxonomists
People from Kolding
University of Copenhagen alumni